Şahip Bolat Abdurrahim (known in Romanian as Şaip Bolat Abduraim) (1893-1978) was a Crimean Tatar spiritual leader, Mufti of the Muslim community of Constanța County.

Biography 
Şahip was born on 29 November 1893 in Azaplar, situated in the Tatar countryside west of Mangalia, a village known today by its official name Tătaru (part of Comana commune). He was married to Fewziye Bolat Abdurrahim  and he served as Mufti of Constanța County between 1933 and 1937. He was preceded by Resul Nuriy and succeeded by Sadîk Bolat Septar.

Şahip died on 31 October 1978 in Constanța. He is resting near his wife in Constanta Muslim Central Cemetery at: 44.173102, 28.622218.

Citations

Sources

See also 
 Islam in Romania
 Crimean Tatars
 List of Crimean Tatars

1893 births
1978 deaths
Muftis of Romania
Crimean Tatar muftis
Tatar people
Romanian Muslims
Romanian people of Crimean Tatar descent
People from Constanța County